Buyback may refer to:

Products
 Buyback of a failed product under an American Lemon law
 Buyback of a product under a Money back guarantee
 Buyback of vehicles under the Canadian Motor Vehicle Arbitration Plan
 Sale and repurchase agreement of goods

Finance 
 Buyback contract, a type of financing deal in the Iranian petroleum industry
 Buyback of shares, see Treasury stock
 Stock buyback, also called share repurchase or share buyback, the repurchase of stock by the company that issued it

See also 
 Gun buyback program